The 1997 Primestar 500 was the fourth stock car race of the 1997 NASCAR Winston Cup Series and the 38th iteration of the event. The race was held on Sunday, March 9, 1997, in Hampton, Georgia at Atlanta Motor Speedway, a  permanent asphalt quad-oval intermediate speedway. The race took the scheduled 328 laps to complete. At race's end, Robert Yates Racing driver Dale Jarrett would dominate the majority of the race to take his ninth career NASCAR Winston Cup Series victory and his first of the season. To fill out the top three, Robert Yates Racing driver Ernie Irvan and Precision Products Racing driver Morgan Shepherd would finish second and third, respectively.

The race was marred by a crash involving Larry Hedrick Motorsports driver Steve Grissom on lap 284. On the track's backstretch, Jimmy Spencer would spin in front of oncoming cars, causing Grissom to spin and fellow driver and rookie Mike Skinner to hit Spencer and become airborne. Grissom's car would proceed to flip wildly, with the rear axle completely torn from the car and with the fuel cell ruptured, fuel would spill onto the track. Grissom was eventually determined to be OK from the accident, with Grissom only suffering a "skinned ankle" according to Grissom himself.

Background 

Atlanta Motor Speedway (formerly Atlanta International Raceway) is a 1.54-mile race track in Hampton, Georgia, United States, 20 miles (32 km) south of Atlanta. It has annually hosted NASCAR Winston Cup Series stock car races since its inauguration in 1960.

The venue was bought by Speedway Motorsports in 1990. In 1994, 46 condominiums were built over the northeastern side of the track. In 1997, to standardize the track with Speedway Motorsports' other two intermediate ovals, the entire track was almost completely rebuilt. The project made the track one of the fastest on the NASCAR circuit.

Entry list 

 (R) - denotes rookie driver.

Qualifying 
Qualifying was split into two rounds. The first round was held on Friday, March 7, at 12:30 PM EST. Each driver would have one lap to set a time. During the first round, the top 25 drivers in the round would be guaranteed a starting spot in the race. If a driver was not able to guarantee a spot in the first round, they had the option to scrub their time from the first round and try and run a faster lap time in a second round qualifying run, held on Saturday, March 8, at 11:00 AM EST. As with the first round, each driver would have one lap to set a time. Positions 26-38 would be decided on time, while positions 39-43 would be based on provisionals. Four spots are awarded by the use of provisionals based on owner's points. The fifth is awarded to a past champion who has not otherwise qualified for the race. If no past champion needs the provisional, the next team in the owner points will be awarded a provisional.

Seven drivers would fail to qualify: Robert Pressley, Derrike Cope, Bobby Hillin Jr., Wally Dallenbach Jr., Ed Berrier, Dave Marcis, and Mike Miller.

Full qualifying results 

*Time not available.

Race results

References 

1997 NASCAR Winston Cup Series
NASCAR races at Atlanta Motor Speedway
March 1997 sports events in the United States
1997 in sports in Georgia (U.S. state)